Achille was a  74-gun French ship of the line built at Rochefort in 1803 after plans by Jacques-Noël Sané.

Under the command of Captain Louis Gabriel Deniéport, she sailed at the vanguard of the French Fleet on 20 October 1805, just before the Battle of Trafalgar, and she was the first Franco-Spanish ship to sight the English fleet, around 6 p.m.

The next day, at the Battle of Trafalgar, the Franco-Spanish fleet veered to form a line of battle, and Achille found herself at the rear of the line. Belleisle was soon completely dismasted, unable to manoeuvre and largely unable to fight, as her sails blinded her batteries, but kept flying her flag for 45 minutes until the other British ships behind her in the column came to her rescue.

At 1:00 p.m, Ensign Arley was killed, followed around 1:30 by the first officer, Commander Montalembert. Captain Deniéport had his leg partly shot off at 2:30, and was killed shortly after refusing to leave his station. With most officers incapacitated, command went to Ensign Jouan, who was killed after 15 minutes. He was replaced by Ensign Cauchard.

By this time Achille was slowly sinking, but still managed to cut off Dreadnoughts main-mast and fore-mast. At 4:00,  joined in. After 15 minutes, a fire broke out in Achilles mizzen top. The next broadside against her brought her blazing main mast down, engulfing the ship in flames. Knowing that her opponent's fate was sealed, Richard Grindall, the Princes captain, ceased firing and wore round to clear Achille before placing boats in the water to rescue the French seamen, as Achilles crew attempted to abandon ship. This proved hazardous as Achilles abandoned but loaded guns were set off by the intense heat now raging below decks. 158 French sailors were saved.

The fires eventually reached her magazine and she blew up spectacularly at 5:45 p.m., taking 480 with her, and foundered quickly, her colours high, marking the end of the battle. An officer serving in HMS Defence wrote:
"It was a sight the most awful and grand that can be conceived. In a moment the hull burst into a cloud of smoke and fire. A column of vivid flame shot up to an enormous height in the atmosphere and terminated by expanding into an immense globe, representing for a few seconds, a prodigious tree in flames, specked with many dark spots, which the pieces of timber and bodies of men occasioned while they were suspended in the clouds."

Achille in art
Achille is featured on The Battle of Trafalgar by J. M. W. Turner.

A  scale model is on display in Paris at the Musée de la Marine.

The rescue of a female member of her crew named Jeannette after the explosion was the inspiration for the coloured engraving Anecdote At the Battle of Trafalgar. It was engraved by M Dubourg and coloured by William Heath.

References

External links
 About Nelson site

Ships of the line of the French Navy
Shipwrecks in the Atlantic Ocean
Téméraire-class ships of the line
Maritime incidents in 1805
Naval magazine explosions
1804 ships